Events from the year 1730 in France.

Incumbents 
Monarch: Louis XV

Events

Births
 

 7 March – Baron de Breteuil, last prime minister of the French monarchy (d. 1807)
 10 July - Jean-Baptiste Willermoz, French Freemason (d. 1824)
 26 July – Charles Messier, French astronomer (d. 1817)

Deaths
 

 20 March – Adrienne Lecouvreur, French actress (b. 1692)
 7 July – Olivier Levasseur, French pirate
 18 July – François de Neufville, duc de Villeroi, French soldier (b. 1644)
 15 October – Antoine Laumet de La Mothe, sieur de Cadillac, French explorer (b. 1658)
 21 November – François de Troy, French portrait artist (b. 1645)

See also

References

1730s in France